The Parliament of the Netherlands Antilles, also translated as the Estates of the Netherlands Antilles, was the parliament of the Netherlands Antilles. It comprised 22 members, elected for a four-year term in three multi-seat constituencies and two single-seat constituencies. On 10 October 2010, the Netherlands Antilles were dissolved, and so was the parliament.

History 

On 20 December 1937, the first parliamentary election took place following the reorganization of the Colonial Council of Curaçao and Dependencies. The first Parliament of the Netherlands Antilles consisted of 15 members, of which 5 were appointed by the Governor of the Netherlands Antilles and 10 were elected through elections held in the territories. In 1949, universal suffrage was introduced and parliament grew from 15 to 21 seats. Beginning in 1950, the Parliament consisted out of 22 seats, elected through proportional representation for a period 4 years.

Seats

List of Presidents 
Following the 1937 general election, the Members of the Parliament of the Netherlands Antilles elected J.H. Sprockel as the first President of the Parliament. The last person to hold this position was Pedro Atacho (2007–2010).

References

Netherlands Antilles
Politics of the Netherlands Antilles
Netherlands Antilles
Dutch Antillean law
2010 disestablishments in the Netherlands Antilles